Keesingia gigas, the "giant" (Greek gigas) Keesingia, is one of two new species of Irukandji jellyfish, the only one of the genus Keesingia in the Alatinid family.

Found off the north-west coast of Western Australia, the species is able to deliver an extremely deadly sting which can cause the victim to experience the Irukandji syndrome which can cause pain, nausea, vomiting and in some rare instances stroke or heart failure.

About the length of a person's arm, the species is unique because Irukandji jellyfish are usually the size of a finger nail. Moreover, none of the specimens found so far have tentacles.  It was named after the marine biologist John Keesing, who captured one near Shark Bay in 2013. This and another new species bring the total number of jellyfish known to cause Irukandji syndrome worldwide up to 16, four them coming from Western Australia.

References

External links
 

Alatinidae
Cnidarians of Australia
Fauna of Western Australia
Animals described in 2014
Monotypic cnidarian genera
Medusozoa genera